Vegetarian Creek is a stream in Allen and Neosho counties, Kansas in the United States.

Vegetarian Creek was named in memory of Octagon City, a colony of vegetarians in the 1850s.

See also
List of rivers of Kansas

References

Rivers of Allen County, Kansas
Rivers of Neosho County, Kansas
Rivers of Kansas